is the creator and designer of most of the Game Boy line, such as Game Boy Color, Game Boy Advance SP and Game Boy Micro handheld consoles from Nintendo. They were developed at the Nintendo Research & Engineering Department where Sugino has served as a design group manager. He also created and designed Virtual Boy.

References 

Nintendo people
Year of birth missing (living people)
Living people